

Fa

Fab-Fan

|- class="vcard"
| class="fn org" | Faberstown
| class="adr" | Wiltshire
| 
| class="note" | 
|- class="vcard"
| class="fn org" | Faccombe
| class="adr" | Hampshire
| 
| class="note" | 
|- class="vcard"
| class="fn org" | Faceby
| class="adr" | North Yorkshire
| 
| class="note" | 
|- class="vcard"
| class="fn org" | Fachell
| class="adr" | Gwynedd
| 
| class="note" | 
|- class="vcard"
| class="fn org" | Fachwen
| class="adr" | Gwynedd
| 
| class="note" | 
|- class="vcard"
| class="fn org" | Facit
| class="adr" | Lancashire
| 
| class="note" | 
|- class="vcard"
| class="fn org" | Fackley
| class="adr" | Nottinghamshire
| 
| class="note" | 
|- class="vcard"
| class="fn org" | Faddiley
| class="adr" | Cheshire
| 
| class="note" | 
|- class="vcard"
| class="fn org" | Fadmoor
| class="adr" | North Yorkshire
| 
| class="note" | 
|- class="vcard"
| class="fn org" | Faerdre
| class="adr" | Swansea
| 
| class="note" | 
|- class="vcard"
| class="fn org" | Fagley
| class="adr" | Bradford
| 
| class="note" | 
|- class="vcard"
| class="fn org" | Fagwyr
| class="adr" | Swansea
| 
| class="note" | 
|- class="vcard"
| class="fn org" | Faichem
| class="adr" | Highland
| 
| class="note" | 
|- class="vcard"
| class="fn org" | Faifley
| class="adr" | West Dunbartonshire
| 
| class="note" | 
|- class="vcard"
| class="fn org" | Failand
| class="adr" | North Somerset
| 
| class="note" | 
|- class="vcard"
| class="fn org" | Failford
| class="adr" | East Ayrshire
| 
| class="note" | 
|- class="vcard"
| class="fn org" | Failsworth
| class="adr" | Oldham
| 
| class="note" | 
|- class="vcard"
| class="fn org" | Fairbourne
| class="adr" | Gwynedd
| 
| class="note" | 
|- class="vcard"
| class="fn org" | Fairbourne Heath
| class="adr" | Kent
| 
| class="note" | 
|- class="vcard"
| class="fn org" | Fairburn
| class="adr" | North Yorkshire
| 
| class="note" | 
|- class="vcard"
| class="fn org" | Fair Cross
| class="adr" | Barking and Dagenham
| 
| class="note" | 
|- class="vcard"
| class="fn org" | Fairfield
| class="adr" | Kent
| 
| class="note" | 
|- class="vcard"
| class="fn org" | Fairfield
| class="adr" | Worcestershire
| 
| class="note" | 
|- class="vcard"
| class="fn org" | Fairfield
| class="adr" | Evesham, Worcestershire
| 
| class="note" | 
|- class="vcard"
| class="fn org" | Fairfield
| class="adr" | Stockton-on-Tees
| 
| class="note" | 
|- class="vcard"
| class="fn org" | Fairfield
| class="adr" | Manchester
| 
| class="note" | 
|- class="vcard"
| class="fn org" | Fairfield
| class="adr" | Bury
| 
| class="note" | 
|- class="vcard"
| class="fn org" | Fairfield
| class="adr" | Liverpool
| 
| class="note" | 
|- class="vcard"
| class="fn org" | Fairfield
| class="adr" | Derbyshire
| 
| class="note" | 
|- class="vcard"
| class="fn org" | Fairfield
| class="adr" | Clackmannan
| 
| class="note" | 
|- class="vcard"
| class="fn org" | Fairfield Park
| class="adr" | Bath and North East Somerset
| 
| class="note" | 
|- class="vcard"
| class="fn org" | Fairfields
| class="adr" | Milton Keynes
| 
| class="note" | 
|- class="vcard"
| class="fn org" | Fairfields
| class="adr" | Gloucestershire
| 
| class="note" | 
|- class="vcard"
| class="fn org" | Fairford
| class="adr" | Gloucestershire
| 
| class="note" | 
|- class="vcard"
| class="fn org" | Fair Green
| class="adr" | Norfolk
| 
| class="note" | 
|- class="vcard"
| class="fn org" | Fair Hill
| class="adr" | Cumbria
| 
| class="note" | 
|- class="vcard"
| class="fn org" | Fairhill
| class="adr" | South Lanarkshire
| 
| class="note" | 
|- class="vcard"
| class="fn org" | Fair Isle
| class="adr" | Shetland Islands
| 
| class="note" | 
|- class="vcard"
| class="fn org" | Fairlands
| class="adr" | Surrey
| 
| class="note" | 
|- class="vcard"
| class="fn org" | Fairlee
| class="adr" | Isle of Wight
| 
| class="note" | 
|- class="vcard"
| class="fn org" | Fairlie
| class="adr" | North Ayrshire
| 
| class="note" | 
|- class="vcard"
| class="fn org" | Fairlight
| class="adr" | East Sussex
| 
| class="note" | 
|- class="vcard"
| class="fn org" | Fairlight Cove
| class="adr" | East Sussex
| 
| class="note" | 
|- class="vcard"
| class="fn org" | Fairlop
| class="adr" | Redbridge
| 
| class="note" | 
|- class="vcard"
| class="fn org" | Fairmile
| class="adr" | Dorset
| 
| class="note" | 
|- class="vcard"
| class="fn org" | Fairmile
| class="adr" | Devon
| 
| class="note" | 
|- class="vcard"
| class="fn org" | Fairmile
| class="adr" | Surrey
| 
| class="note" | 
|- class="vcard"
| class="fn org" | Fairmilehead
| class="adr" | City of Edinburgh
| 
| class="note" | 
|- class="vcard"
| class="fn org" | Fair Moor
| class="adr" | Northumberland
| 
| class="note" | 
|- class="vcard"
| class="fn org" | Fairoak
| class="adr" | Caerphilly
| 
| class="note" | 
|- class="vcard"
| class="fn org" | Fair Oak (near Eastleigh)
| class="adr" | Hampshire
| 
| class="note" | 
|- class="vcard"
| class="fn org" | Fair Oak (Ashford Hill)
| class="adr" | Hampshire
| 
| class="note" | 
|- class="vcard"
| class="fn org" | Fair Oak
| class="adr" | Lancashire
| 
| class="note" | 
|- class="vcard"
| class="fn org" | Fairoak
| class="adr" | Staffordshire
| 
| class="note" | 
|- class="vcard"
| class="fn org" | Fair Oak Green
| class="adr" | Hampshire
| 
| class="note" | 
|- class="vcard"
| class="fn org" | Fairseat
| class="adr" | Kent
| 
| class="note" | 
|- class="vcard"
| class="fn org" | Fairstead
| class="adr" | Essex
| 
| class="note" | 
|- class="vcard"
| class="fn org" | Fairstead
| class="adr" | Norfolk
| 
| class="note" | 
|- class="vcard"
| class="fn org" | Fairview
| class="adr" | Gloucestershire
| 
| class="note" | 
|- class="vcard"
| class="fn org" | Fairwarp
| class="adr" | East Sussex
| 
| class="note" | 
|- class="vcard"
| class="fn org" | Fairwater
| class="adr" | Torfaen
| 
| class="note" | 
|- class="vcard"
| class="fn org" | Fairwater
| class="adr" | Cardiff
| 
| class="note" | 
|- class="vcard"
| class="fn org" | Fairwood
| class="adr" | Wiltshire
| 
| class="note" | 
|- class="vcard"
| class="fn org" | Fairy Cross
| class="adr" | Devon
| 
| class="note" | 
|- class="vcard"
| class="fn org" | Fakenham
| class="adr" | Norfolk
| 
| class="note" | 
|- class="vcard"
| class="fn org" | Fakenham Magna
| class="adr" | Suffolk
| 
| class="note" | 
|- class="vcard"
| class="fn org" | Fala
| class="adr" | Midlothian
| 
| class="note" | 
|- class="vcard"
| class="fn org" | Falahill
| class="adr" | Scottish Borders
| 
| class="note" | 
|- class="vcard"
| class="fn org" | Falcon
| class="adr" | Herefordshire
| 
| class="note" | 
|- class="vcard"
| class="fn org" | Falcon Lodge
| class="adr" | Birmingham
| 
| class="note" | 
|- class="vcard"
| class="fn org" | Falconwood
| class="adr" | Greenwich
| 
| class="note" | 
|- class="vcard"
| class="fn org" | Falcutt
| class="adr" | Northamptonshire
| 
| class="note" | 
|- class="vcard"
| class="fn org" | Faldingworth
| class="adr" | Lincolnshire
| 
| class="note" | 
|- class="vcard"
| class="fn org" | Faldonside
| class="adr" | Scottish Borders
| 
| class="note" | 
|- class="vcard"
| class="fn org" | Falfield
| class="adr" | South Gloucestershire
| 
| class="note" | 
|- class="vcard"
| class="fn org" | Falkenham
| class="adr" | Suffolk
| 
| class="note" | 
|- class="vcard"
| class="fn org" | Falkenham Sink
| class="adr" | Suffolk
| 
| class="note" | 
|- class="vcard"
| class="fn org" | Falkirk
| class="adr" | 
| 
| class="note" | 
|- class="vcard"
| class="fn org" | Falkland
| class="adr" | Fife
| 
| class="note" | 
|- class="vcard"
| class="fn org" | Fallgate
| class="adr" | Derbyshire
| 
| class="note" | 
|- class="vcard"
| class="fn org" | Fallin
| class="adr" | Stirling
| 
| class="note" | 
|- class="vcard"
| class="fn org" | Fallinge
| class="adr" | Derbyshire
| 
| class="note" | 
|- class="vcard"
| class="fn org" | Fallings Heath
| class="adr" | Walsall
| 
| class="note" | 
|- class="vcard"
| class="fn org" | Fallowfield
| class="adr" | Manchester
| 
| class="note" | 
|- class="vcard"
| class="fn org" | Fallside
| class="adr" | South Lanarkshire
| 
| class="note" | 
|- class="vcard"
| class="fn org" | Falmer
| class="adr" | Brighton and Hove
| 
| class="note" | 
|- class="vcard"
| class="fn org" | Falmouth
| class="adr" | Cornwall
| 
| class="note" | 
|- class="vcard"
| class="fn org" | Falnash
| class="adr" | Scottish Borders
| 
| class="note" | 
|- class="vcard"
| class="fn org" | Falsgrave
| class="adr" | North Yorkshire
| 
| class="note" | 
|- class="vcard"
| class="fn org" | Falside
| class="adr" | West Lothian
| 
| class="note" | 
|- class="vcard"
| class="fn org" | Falstone
| class="adr" | Northumberland
| 
| class="note" | 
|- class="vcard"
| class="fn org" | Fanagmore
| class="adr" | Highland
| 
| class="note" | 
|- class="vcard"
| class="fn org" | Fancott
| class="adr" | Bedfordshire
| 
| class="note" | 
|- class="vcard"
| class="fn org" | Fanellan
| class="adr" | Highland
| 
| class="note" | 
|- class="vcard"
| class="fn org" | Fangdale Beck
| class="adr" | North Yorkshire
| 
| class="note" | 
|- class="vcard"
| class="fn org" | Fangfoss
| class="adr" | East Riding of Yorkshire
| 
| class="note" | 
|- class="vcard"
| class="fn org" | Fankerton
| class="adr" | Falkirk
| 
| class="note" | 
|- class="vcard"
| class="fn org" | Fanmore
| class="adr" | Argyll and Bute
| 
| class="note" | 
|- class="vcard"
| class="fn org" | Fanner's Green
| class="adr" | Essex
| 
| class="note" | 
|- class="vcard"
| class="fn org" | Fans
| class="adr" | Scottish Borders
| 
| class="note" | 
|- class="vcard"
| class="fn org" | Fanshowe
| class="adr" | Cheshire
| 
| class="note" | 
|- class="vcard"
| class="fn org" | Fant
| class="adr" | Kent
| 
| class="note" | 
|}

Far

|- class="vcard"
| class="fn org" | Fara
| class="adr" | Orkney Islands
| 
| class="note" | 
|- class="vcard"
| class="fn org" | Faraid Head
| class="adr" | Highland
| 
| class="note" | 
|- class="vcard"
| class="fn org" | Far Arnside
| class="adr" | Cumbria
| 
| class="note" | 
|- class="vcard"
| class="fn org" | Faray
| class="adr" | Orkney Islands
| 
| class="note" | 
|- class="vcard"
| class="fn org" | Far Bank
| class="adr" | Doncaster
| 
| class="note" | 
|- class="vcard"
| class="fn org" | Far Banks
| class="adr" | Lancashire
| 
| class="note" | 
|- class="vcard"
| class="fn org" | Farcet
| class="adr" | Cambridgeshire
| 
| class="note" | 
|- class="vcard"
| class="fn org" | Far Coton
| class="adr" | Leicestershire
| 
| class="note" | 
|- class="vcard"
| class="fn org" | Far Cotton
| class="adr" | Northamptonshire
| 
| class="note" | 
|- class="vcard"
| class="fn org" | Farden
| class="adr" | Shropshire
| 
| class="note" | 
|- class="vcard"
| class="fn org" | Fareham
| class="adr" | Hampshire
| 
| class="note" | 
|- class="vcard"
| class="fn org" | Far End
| class="adr" | Cumbria
| 
| class="note" | 
|- class="vcard"
| class="fn org" | Farewell
| class="adr" | Staffordshire
| 
| class="note" | 
|- class="vcard"
| class="fn org" | Far Forest
| class="adr" | Worcestershire
| 
| class="note" | 
|- class="vcard"
| class="fn org" | Farforth
| class="adr" | Lincolnshire
| 
| class="note" | 
|- class="vcard"
| class="fn org" | Far Green
| class="adr" | Gloucestershire
| 
| class="note" | 
|- class="vcard"
| class="fn org" | Farhill
| class="adr" | Derbyshire
| 
| class="note" | 
|- class="vcard"
| class="fn org" | Far Hoarcross
| class="adr" | Staffordshire
| 
| class="note" | 
|- class="vcard"
| class="fn org" | Faringdon
| class="adr" | Oxfordshire
| 
| class="note" | 
|- class="vcard"
| class="fn org" | Farington (area of Leyland)
| class="adr" | Lancashire
| 
| class="note" | 
|- class="vcard"
| class="fn org" | Farington (near Leyland)
| class="adr" | Lancashire
| 
| class="note" | 
|- class="vcard"
| class="fn org" | Farington Moss
| class="adr" | Lancashire
| 
| class="note" | 
|- class="vcard"
| class="fn org" | Farlam
| class="adr" | Cumbria
| 
| class="note" | 
|- class="vcard"
| class="fn org" | Farland Head
| class="adr" | North Ayrshire
| 
| class="note" | 
|- class="vcard"
| class="fn org" | Farlands Booth
| class="adr" | Derbyshire
| 
| class="note" | 
|- class="vcard"
| class="fn org" | Far Laund
| class="adr" | Derbyshire
| 
| class="note" | 
|- class="vcard"
| class="fn org" | Farleigh
| class="adr" | North Somerset
| 
| class="note" | 
|- class="vcard"
| class="fn org" | Farleigh
| class="adr" | Surrey
| 
| class="note" | 
|- class="vcard"
| class="fn org" | Farleigh Court
| class="adr" | Surrey
| 
| class="note" | 
|- class="vcard"
| class="fn org" | Farleigh Green
| class="adr" | Kent
| 
| class="note" | 
|- class="vcard"
| class="fn org" | Farleigh Hungerford
| class="adr" | Somerset
| 
| class="note" | 
|- class="vcard"
| class="fn org" | Farleigh Wallop
| class="adr" | Hampshire
| 
| class="note" | 
|- class="vcard"
| class="fn org" | Farleigh Wick
| class="adr" | Wiltshire
| 
| class="note" | 
|- class="vcard"
| class="fn org" | Farlesthorpe
| class="adr" | Lincolnshire
| 
| class="note" | 
|- class="vcard"
| class="fn org" | Farleton
| class="adr" | Cumbria
| 
| class="note" | 
|- class="vcard"
| class="fn org" | Farleton
| class="adr" | Lancashire
| 
| class="note" | 
|- class="vcard"
| class="fn org" | Farley
| class="adr" | Wiltshire
| 
| class="note" | 
|- class="vcard"
| class="fn org" | Far Ley
| class="adr" | Shropshire
| 
| class="note" | 
|- class="vcard"
| class="fn org" | Farley
| class="adr" | North Somerset
| 
| class="note" | 
|- class="vcard"
| class="fn org" | Farley
| class="adr" | Derbyshire
| 
| class="note" | 
|- class="vcard"
| class="fn org" | Farley
| class="adr" | Staffordshire
| 
| class="note" | 
|- class="vcard"
| class="fn org" | Farley (Much Wenlock)
| class="adr" | Shropshire
| 
| class="note" | 
|- class="vcard"
| class="fn org" | Farley (Pontesbury)
| class="adr" | Shropshire
| 
| class="note" | 
|- class="vcard"
| class="fn org" | Farley Green
| class="adr" | Surrey
| 
| class="note" | 
|- class="vcard"
| class="fn org" | Farley Green
| class="adr" | Suffolk
| 
| class="note" | 
|- class="vcard"
| class="fn org" | Farley Hill
| class="adr" | Bedfordshire
| 
| class="note" | 
|- class="vcard"
| class="fn org" | Farley Hill
| class="adr" | Berkshire
| 
| class="note" | 
|- class="vcard"
| class="fn org" | Farleys End
| class="adr" | Gloucestershire
| 
| class="note" | 
|- class="vcard"
| class="fn org" | Farlington
| class="adr" | City of Portsmouth
| 
| class="note" | 
|- class="vcard"
| class="fn org" | Farlington
| class="adr" | North Yorkshire
| 
| class="note" | 
|- class="vcard"
| class="fn org" | Farlow
| class="adr" | Shropshire
| 
| class="note" | 
|- class="vcard"
| class="fn org" | Farmborough
| class="adr" | Bath and North East Somerset
| 
| class="note" | 
|- class="vcard"
| class="fn org" | Farmbridge End
| class="adr" | Essex
| 
| class="note" | 
|- class="vcard"
| class="fn org" | Farmcote
| class="adr" | Shropshire
| 
| class="note" | 
|- class="vcard"
| class="fn org" | Farmcote
| class="adr" | Gloucestershire
| 
| class="note" | 
|- class="vcard"
| class="fn org" | Farmington
| class="adr" | Gloucestershire
| 
| class="note" | 
|- class="vcard"
| class="fn org" | Farmoor
| class="adr" | Oxfordshire
| 
| class="note" | 
|- class="vcard"
| class="fn org" | Far Moor
| class="adr" | Wigan
| 
| class="note" | 
|- class="vcard"
| class="fn org" | Farms Common
| class="adr" | Cornwall
| 
| class="note" | 
|- class="vcard"
| class="fn org" | Farmtown
| class="adr" | Moray
| 
| class="note" | 
|- class="vcard"
| class="fn org" | Farm Town
| class="adr" | Leicestershire
| 
| class="note" | 
|- class="vcard"
| class="fn org" | Farnah Green
| class="adr" | Derbyshire
| 
| class="note" | 
|- class="vcard"
| class="fn org" | Farnborough
| class="adr" | Berkshire
| 
| class="note" | 
|- class="vcard"
| class="fn org" | Farnborough
| class="adr" | Bromley
| 
| class="note" | 
|- class="vcard"
| class="fn org" | Farnborough
| class="adr" | Hampshire
| 
| class="note" | 
|- class="vcard"
| class="fn org" | Farnborough
| class="adr" | Warwickshire
| 
| class="note" | 
|- class="vcard"
| class="fn org" | Farnborough Green
| class="adr" | Hampshire|
| 
| class="note" | 
|- class="vcard"
| class="fn org" | Farnborough Park
| class="adr" | Hampshire
| 
| class="note" | 
|- class="vcard"
| class="fn org" | Farnborough Park
| class="adr" | Bromley
| 
| class="note" | 
|- class="vcard"
| class="fn org" | Farnborough Street
| class="adr" | Hampshire
| 
| class="note" | 
|- class="vcard"
| class="fn org" | Farncombe
| class="adr" | Surrey
| 
| class="note" | 
|- class="vcard"
| class="fn org" | Farndish
| class="adr" | Bedfordshire
| 
| class="note" | 
|- class="vcard"
| class="fn org" | Farndon
| class="adr" | Nottinghamshire
| 
| class="note" | 
|- class="vcard"
| class="fn org" | Farndon
| class="adr" | Wrexham
| 
| class="note" | 
|- class="vcard"
| class="fn org" | Farnell
| class="adr" | Angus
| 
| class="note" | 
|- class="vcard"
| class="fn org" | Farnham
| class="adr" | Surrey
| 
| class="note" | 
|- class="vcard"
| class="fn org" | Farnham
| class="adr" | Dorset
| 
| class="note" | 
|- class="vcard"
| class="fn org" | Farnham
| class="adr" | Suffolk
| 
| class="note" | 
|- class="vcard"
| class="fn org" | Farnham
| class="adr" | Essex
| 
| class="note" | 
|- class="vcard"
| class="fn org" | Farnham
| class="adr" | North Yorkshire
| 
| class="note" | 
|- class="vcard"
| class="fn org" | Farnham Common
| class="adr" | Buckinghamshire
| 
| class="note" | 
|- class="vcard"
| class="fn org" | Farnham Green
| class="adr" | Hertfordshire
| 
| class="note" | 
|- class="vcard"
| class="fn org" | Farnham Park
| class="adr" | Buckinghamshire
| 
| class="note" | 
|- class="vcard"
| class="fn org" | Farnham Royal
| class="adr" | Buckinghamshire
| 
| class="note" | 
|- class="vcard"
| class="fn org" | Farnhill
| class="adr" | North Yorkshire
| 
| class="note" | 
|- class="vcard"
| class="fn org" | Farningham
| class="adr" | Kent
| 
| class="note" | 
|- class="vcard"
| class="fn org" | Farnley
| class="adr" | Leeds
| 
| class="note" | 
|- class="vcard"
| class="fn org" | Farnley
| class="adr" | North Yorkshire
| 
| class="note" | 
|- class="vcard"
| class="fn org" | Farnley Bank
| class="adr" | Kirklees
| 
| class="note" | 
|- class="vcard"
| class="fn org" | Farnley Tyas
| class="adr" | Kirklees
| 
| class="note" | 
|- class="vcard"
| class="fn org" | Farnsfield
| class="adr" | Nottinghamshire
| 
| class="note" | 
|- class="vcard"
| class="fn org" | Farnworth
| class="adr" | Bolton
| 
| class="note" | 
|- class="vcard"
| class="fn org" | Farnworth
| class="adr" | Cheshire
| 
| class="note" | 
|- class="vcard"
| class="fn org" | Far Oakridge
| class="adr" | Gloucestershire
| 
| class="note" | 
|- class="vcard"
| class="fn org" | Farr
| class="adr" | Highland
| 
| class="note" | 
|- class="vcard"
| class="fn org" | Farraline
| class="adr" | Highland
| 
| class="note" | 
|- class="vcard"
| class="fn org" | Farringdon
| class="adr" | Devon
| 
| class="note" | 
|- class="vcard"
| class="fn org" | Farringdon
| class="adr" | Sunderland
| 
| class="note" | 
|- class="vcard"
| class="fn org" | Farrington
| class="adr" | Dorset
| 
| class="note" | 
|- class="vcard"
| class="fn org" | Farrington Gurney
| class="adr" | Somerset
| 
| class="note" | 
|- class="vcard"
| class="fn org" | Far Royds
| class="adr" | Leeds
| 
| class="note" | 
|- class="vcard"
| class="fn org" | Far Sawrey
| class="adr" | Cumbria
| 
| class="note" | 
|- class="vcard"
| class="fn org" | Farsley
| class="adr" | Leeds
| 
| class="note" | 
|- class="vcard"
| class="fn org" | Farsley Beck Bottom
| class="adr" | Leeds
| 
| class="note" | 
|- class="vcard"
| class="fn org" | Farther Howegreen
| class="adr" | Essex
| 
| class="note" | 
|- class="vcard"
| class="fn org" | Farthing Corner
| class="adr" | Kent
| 
| class="note" | 
|- class="vcard"
| class="fn org" | Farthing Green
| class="adr" | Kent
| 
| class="note" | 
|- class="vcard"
| class="fn org" | Farthinghoe
| class="adr" | Northamptonshire
| 
| class="note" | 
|- class="vcard"
| class="fn org" | Farthingloe
| class="adr" | Kent
| 
| class="note" | 
|- class="vcard"
| class="fn org" | Farthingstone
| class="adr" | Northamptonshire
| 
| class="note" | 
|- class="vcard"
| class="fn org" | Farthing Street
| class="adr" | Bromley
| 
| class="note" | 
|- class="vcard"
| class="fn org" | Far Thrupp
| class="adr" | Gloucestershire
| 
| class="note" | 
|- class="vcard"
| class="fn org" | Fartown
| class="adr" | Kirklees
| 
| class="note" | 
|- class="vcard"
| class="fn org" | Farway
| class="adr" | Devon
| 
| class="note" | 
|- class="vcard"
| class="fn org" | Farway Marsh
| class="adr" | Devon
| 
| class="note" | 
|- class="vcard"
| class="fn org" | Farwig
| class="adr" | Bromley
| 
| class="note" | 
|}

Fas-Faz

|- class="vcard"
| class="fn org" | Fasach
| class="adr" | Highland
| 
| class="note" | 
|- class="vcard"
| class="fn org" | Fasag
| class="adr" | Highland
| 
| class="note" | 
|- class="vcard"
| class="fn org" | Faskally
| class="adr" | Perth and Kinross
| 
| class="note" | 
|- class="vcard"
| class="fn org" | Faslane Port
| class="adr" | Argyll and Bute
| 
| class="note" | 
|- class="vcard"
| class="fn org" | Fasnacloich
| class="adr" | Argyll and Bute
| 
| class="note" | 
|- class="vcard"
| class="fn org" | Fassfern
| class="adr" | Highland
| 
| class="note" | 
|- class="vcard"
| class="fn org" | Fatfield
| class="adr" | Sunderland
| 
| class="note" | 
|- class="vcard"
| class="fn org" | Faucheldean
| class="adr" | West Lothian
| 
| class="note" | 
|- class="vcard"
| class="fn org" | Faugh
| class="adr" | Cumbria
| 
| class="note" | 
|- class="vcard"
| class="fn org" | Faughill
| class="adr" | Scottish Borders
| 
| class="note" | 
|- class="vcard"
| class="fn org" | Fauld
| class="adr" | Staffordshire
| 
| class="note" | 
|- class="vcard"
| class="fn org" | Fauldhouse
| class="adr" | West Lothian
| 
| class="note" | 
|- class="vcard"
| class="fn org" | Fauldshope
| class="adr" | Scottish Borders
| 
| class="note" | 
|- class="vcard"
| class="fn org" | Faulkbourne
| class="adr" | Essex
| 
| class="note" | 
|- class="vcard"
| class="fn org" | Faulkland
| class="adr" | Somerset
| 
| class="note" | 
|- class="vcard"
| class="fn org" | Fauls
| class="adr" | Shropshire
| 
| class="note" | 
|- class="vcard"
| class="fn org" | Faverdale
| class="adr" | Darlington
| 
| class="note" | 
|- class="vcard"
| class="fn org" | Faversham
| class="adr" | Kent
| 
| class="note" | 
|- class="vcard"
| class="fn org" | Fawdington
| class="adr" | North Yorkshire
| 
| class="note" | 
|- class="vcard"
| class="fn org" | Fawdon
| class="adr" | Northumberland
| 
| class="note" | 
|- class="vcard"
| class="fn org" | Fawdon
| class="adr" | Newcastle upon Tyne
| 
| class="note" | 
|- class="vcard"
| class="fn org" | Fawfieldhead
| class="adr" | Staffordshire
| 
| class="note" | 
|- class="vcard"
| class="fn org" | Fawkham Green
| class="adr" | Kent
| 
| class="note" | 
|- class="vcard"
| class="fn org" | Fawler (West Oxfordshire)
| class="adr" | Oxfordshire
| 
| class="note" | 
|- class="vcard"
| class="fn org" | Fawler (Vale of White Horse)
| class="adr" | Oxfordshire
| 
| class="note" | 
|- class="vcard"
| class="fn org" | Fawley
| class="adr" | Hampshire
| 
| class="note" | 
|- class="vcard"
| class="fn org" | Fawley
| class="adr" | Berkshire
| 
| class="note" | 
|- class="vcard"
| class="fn org" | Fawley
| class="adr" | Buckinghamshire
| 
| class="note" | 
|- class="vcard"
| class="fn org" | Fawley Bottom
| class="adr" | Buckinghamshire
| 
| class="note" | 
|- class="vcard"
| class="fn org" | Fawley Chapel
| class="adr" | Herefordshire
| 
| class="note" | 
|- class="vcard"
| class="fn org" | Faxfleet
| class="adr" | East Riding of Yorkshire
| 
| class="note" | 
|- class="vcard"
| class="fn org" | Faygate
| class="adr" | West Sussex
| 
| class="note" | 
|- class="vcard"
| class="fn org" | Fazakerley
| class="adr" | Liverpool
| 
| class="note" | 
|- class="vcard"
| class="fn org" | Fazeley
| class="adr" | Staffordshire
| 
| class="note" | 
|}

Fe

Fea-Fel

|- class="vcard"
| class="fn org" | Feagour
| class="adr" | Highland
| 
| class="note" | 
|- class="vcard"
| class="fn org" | Fearby
| class="adr" | North Yorkshire
| 
| class="note" | 
|- class="vcard"
| class="fn org" | Fearn
| class="adr" | Highland
| 
| class="note" | 
|- class="vcard"
| class="fn org" | Fearnan
| class="adr" | Perth and Kinross
| 
| class="note" | 
|- class="vcard"
| class="fn org" | Fearnbeg
| class="adr" | Highland
| 
| class="note" | 
|- class="vcard"
| class="fn org" | Fearnhead
| class="adr" | Cheshire
| 
| class="note" | 
|- class="vcard"
| class="fn org" | Fearnmore
| class="adr" | Highland
| 
| class="note" | 
|- class="vcard"
| class="fn org" | Fearnville
| class="adr" | Leeds
| 
| class="note" | 
|- class="vcard"
| class="fn org" | Featherstone
| class="adr" | Wakefield
| 
| class="note" | 
|- class="vcard"
| class="fn org" | Featherstone
| class="adr" | Staffordshire
| 
| class="note" | 
|- class="vcard"
| class="fn org" | Fechlin
| class="adr" | Highland
| 
| class="note" | 
|- class="vcard"
| class="fn org" | Feckenham
| class="adr" | Worcestershire
| 
| class="note" | 
|- class="vcard"
| class="fn org" | Fedw Fawr
| class="adr" | Isle of Anglesey
| 
| class="note" | 
|- class="vcard"
| class="fn org" | Feering
| class="adr" | Essex
| 
| class="note" | 
|- class="vcard"
| class="fn org" | Feetham
| class="adr" | North Yorkshire
| 
| class="note" | 
|- class="vcard"
| class="fn org" | Fegg Hayes
| class="adr" | City of Stoke-on-Trent
| 
| class="note" | 
|- class="vcard"
| class="fn org" | Feizor
| class="adr" | North Yorkshire
| 
| class="note" | 
|- class="vcard"
| class="fn org" | Felbridge
| class="adr" | West Sussex
| 
| class="note" | 
|- class="vcard"
| class="fn org" | Felbrigg
| class="adr" | Norfolk
| 
| class="note" | 
|- class="vcard"
| class="fn org" | Felcourt
| class="adr" | Surrey
| 
| class="note" | 
|- class="vcard"
| class="fn org" | Felderland
| class="adr" | Kent
| 
| class="note" | 
|- class="vcard"
| class="fn org" | Feldy
| class="adr" | Cheshire
| 
| class="note" | 
|- class="vcard"
| class="fn org" | Felhampton
| class="adr" | Shropshire
| 
| class="note" | 
|- class="vcard"
| class="fn org" | Felin-Crai
| class="adr" | Powys
| 
| class="note" | 
|- class="vcard"
| class="fn org" | Felindre (Llangeler)
| class="adr" | Carmarthenshire
| 
| class="note" | 
|- class="vcard"
| class="fn org" | Felindre (Llangyndeyrn)
| class="adr" | Carmarthenshire
| 
| class="note" | 
|- class="vcard"
| class="fn org" | Felindre (Llangathen)
| class="adr" | Carmarthenshire
| 
| class="note" | 
|- class="vcard"
| class="fn org" | Felindre (Llangadog)
| class="adr" | Carmarthenshire
| 
| class="note" | 
|- class="vcard"
| class="fn org" | Felindre (Beguildy)
| class="adr" | Powys
| 
| class="note" | 
|- class="vcard"
| class="fn org" | Felindre (Berriew)
| class="adr" | Powys
| 
| class="note" | 
|- class="vcard"
| class="fn org" | Felindre (Llanfihangel Cwmdu)
| class="adr" | Powys
| 
| class="note" | 
|- class="vcard"
| class="fn org" | Felindre
| class="adr" | Rhondda, Cynon, Taff
| 
| class="note" | 
|- class="vcard"
| class="fn org" | Felindre
| class="adr" | Swansea
| 
| class="note" | 
|- class="vcard"
| class="fn org" | Felindre Farchog
| class="adr" | Pembrokeshire
| 
| class="note" | 
|- class="vcard"
| class="fn org" | Felinfach
| class="adr" | Ceredigion
| 
| class="note" | 
|- class="vcard"
| class="fn org" | Felinfach
| class="adr" | Powys
| 
| class="note" | 
|- class="vcard"
| class="fn org" | Felinfoel
| class="adr" | Carmarthenshire
| 
| class="note" | 
|- class="vcard"
| class="fn org" | Felingwmisaf
| class="adr" | Carmarthenshire
| 
| class="note" | 
|- class="vcard"
| class="fn org" | Felingwmuchaf
| class="adr" | Carmarthenshire
| 
| class="note" | 
|- class="vcard"
| class="fn org" | Felin Newydd
| class="adr" | Carmarthenshire
| 
| class="note" | 
|- class="vcard"
| class="fn org" | Felin-newydd
| class="adr" | Powys
| 
| class="note" | 
|- class="vcard"
| class="fn org" | Felin Newydd
| class="adr" | Powys
| 
| class="note" | 
|- class="vcard"
| class="fn org" | Felin Puleston
| class="adr" | Wrexham
| 
| class="note" | 
|- class="vcard"
| class="fn org" | Felin-Wnda
| class="adr" | Ceredigion
| 
| class="note" | 
|- class="vcard"
| class="fn org" | Felixkirk
| class="adr" | North Yorkshire
| 
| class="note" | 
|- class="vcard"
| class="fn org" | Felixstowe
| class="adr" | Suffolk
| 
| class="note" | 
|- class="vcard"
| class="fn org" | Felixstowe Ferry
| class="adr" | Suffolk
| 
| class="note" | 
|- class="vcard"
| class="fn org" | Felkington
| class="adr" | Northumberland
| 
| class="note" | 
|- class="vcard"
| class="fn org" | Felkirk
| class="adr" | Barnsley
| 
| class="note" | 
|- class="vcard"
| class="fn org" | Felldyke
| class="adr" | Cumbria
| 
| class="note" | 
|- class="vcard"
| class="fn org" | Fell End
| class="adr" | Cumbria
| 
| class="note" | 
|- class="vcard"
| class="fn org" | Fellgate
| class="adr" | South Tyneside
| 
| class="note" | 
|- class="vcard"
| class="fn org" | Felling
| class="adr" | Gateshead
| 
| class="note" | 
|- class="vcard"
| class="fn org" | Felling Shore
| class="adr" | Gateshead
| 
| class="note" | 
|- class="vcard"
| class="fn org" | Fell Lane
| class="adr" | Bradford
| 
| class="note" | 
|- class="vcard"
| class="fn org" | Fell Side
| class="adr" | Cumbria
| 
| class="note" | 
|- class="vcard"
| class="fn org" | Fellside
| class="adr" | Gateshead
| 
| class="note" | 
|- class="vcard"
| class="fn org" | Felmersham
| class="adr" | Bedfordshire
| 
| class="note" | 
|- class="vcard"
| class="fn org" | Felmingham
| class="adr" | Norfolk
| 
| class="note" | 
|- class="vcard"
| class="fn org" | Felmore
| class="adr" | Essex
| 
| class="note" | 
|- class="vcard"
| class="fn org" | Felpham
| class="adr" | West Sussex
| 
| class="note" | 
|- class="vcard"
| class="fn org" | Felsham
| class="adr" | Suffolk
| 
| class="note" | 
|- class="vcard"
| class="fn org" | Felsted
| class="adr" | Essex
| 
| class="note" | 
|- class="vcard"
| class="fn org" | Feltham
| class="adr" | Hounslow
| 
| class="note" | 
|- class="vcard"
| class="fn org" | Feltham
| class="adr" | Somerset
| 
| class="note" | 
|- class="vcard"
| class="fn org" | Felthamhill
| class="adr" | Surrey
| 
| class="note" | 
|- class="vcard"
| class="fn org" | Felthorpe
| class="adr" | Norfolk
| 
| class="note" | 
|- class="vcard"
| class="fn org" | Felton
| class="adr" | Herefordshire
| 
| class="note" | 
|- class="vcard"
| class="fn org" | Felton
| class="adr" | North Somerset
| 
| class="note" | 
|- class="vcard"
| class="fn org" | Felton
| class="adr" | Northumberland
| 
| class="note" | 
|- class="vcard"
| class="fn org" | Felton Butler
| class="adr" | Shropshire
| 
| class="note" | 
|- class="vcard"
| class="fn org" | Feltwell
| class="adr" | Norfolk
| 
| class="note" | 
|}

Fen

|- class="vcard"
| class="fn org" | Fenay Bridge
| class="adr" | Kirklees
| 
| class="note" | 
|- class="vcard"
| class="fn org" | Fence
| class="adr" | Lancashire
| 
| class="note" | 
|- class="vcard"
| class="fn org" | Fence Houses
| class="adr" | Sunderland
| 
| class="note" | 
|- class="vcard"
| class="fn org" | Fencott
| class="adr" | Oxfordshire
| 
| class="note" | 
|- class="vcard"
| class="fn org" | Fenderbridge
| class="adr" | Perth and Kinross
| 
| class="note" | 
|- class="vcard"
| class="fn org" | Fen Ditton
| class="adr" | Cambridgeshire
| 
| class="note" | 
|- class="vcard"
| class="fn org" | Fen Drayton
| class="adr" | Cambridgeshire
| 
| class="note" | 
|- class="vcard"
| class="fn org" | Fen End
| class="adr" | Solihull
| 
| class="note" | 
|- class="vcard"
| class="fn org" | Fen End
| class="adr" | Lincolnshire
| 
| class="note" | 
|- class="vcard"
| class="fn org" | Fengate
| class="adr" | Cambridgeshire
| 
| class="note" | 
|- class="vcard"
| class="fn org" | Fengate
| class="adr" | Norfolk
| 
| class="note" | 
|- class="vcard"
| class="fn org" | Fenham
| class="adr" | Newcastle upon Tyne
| 
| class="note" | 
|- class="vcard"
| class="fn org" | Fenhouses
| class="adr" | Lincolnshire
| 
| class="note" | 
|- class="vcard"
| class="fn org" | Feniscliffe
| class="adr" | Lancashire
| 
| class="note" | 
|- class="vcard"
| class="fn org" | Feniscowles
| class="adr" | Lancashire
| 
| class="note" | 
|- class="vcard"
| class="fn org" | Feniton
| class="adr" | Devon
| 
| class="note" | 
|- class="vcard"
| class="fn org" | Fenlake
| class="adr" | Bedfordshire
| 
| class="note" | 
|- class="vcard"
| class="fn org" | Fenn Green
| class="adr" | Shropshire
| 
| class="note" | 
|- class="vcard"
| class="fn org" | Fennington
| class="adr" | Somerset
| 
| class="note" | 
|- class="vcard"
| class="fn org" | Fenn's Bank
| class="adr" | Wrexham
| 
| class="note" | 
|- class="vcard"
| class="fn org" | Fenn Street
| class="adr" | Kent
| 
| class="note" | 
|- class="vcard"
| class="fn org" | Fenny Bentley
| class="adr" | Derbyshire
| 
| class="note" | 
|- class="vcard"
| class="fn org" | Fenny Bridges
| class="adr" | Devon
| 
| class="note" | 
|- class="vcard"
| class="fn org" | Fenny Compton
| class="adr" | Warwickshire
| 
| class="note" | 
|- class="vcard"
| class="fn org" | Fenny Drayton
| class="adr" | Leicestershire
| 
| class="note" | 
|- class="vcard"
| class="fn org" | Fenny Stratford
| class="adr" | Milton Keynes
| 
| class="note" | 
|- class="vcard"
| class="fn org" | Fen Side
| class="adr" | Lincolnshire
| 
| class="note" | 
|- class="vcard"
| class="fn org" | Fenstanton
| class="adr" | Cambridgeshire
| 
| class="note" | 
|- class="vcard"
| class="fn org" | Fenstead End
| class="adr" | Suffolk
| 
| class="note" | 
|- class="vcard"
| class="fn org" | Fen Street (Redgrave)
| class="adr" | Suffolk
| 
| class="note" | 
|- class="vcard"
| class="fn org" | Fen Street (Hopton)
| class="adr" | Suffolk
| 
| class="note" | 
|- class="vcard"
| class="fn org" | Fen Street
| class="adr" | Norfolk
| 
| class="note" | 
|- class="vcard"
| class="fn org" | Fenton
| class="adr" | Cambridgeshire
| 
| class="note" | 
|- class="vcard"
| class="fn org" | Fenton
| class="adr" | Northumberland
| 
| class="note" | 
|- class="vcard"
| class="fn org" | Fenton
| class="adr" | Cumbria
| 
| class="note" | 
|- class="vcard"
| class="fn org" | Fenton
| class="adr" | City of Stoke-on-Trent
| 
| class="note" | 
|- class="vcard"
| class="fn org" | Fenton (West Lindsey)
| class="adr" | Lincolnshire
| 
| class="note" | 
|- class="vcard"
| class="fn org" | Fenton (South Kesteven)
| class="adr" | Lincolnshire
| 
| class="note" | 
|- class="vcard"
| class="fn org" | Fentonadle
| class="adr" | Cornwall
| 
| class="note" | 
|- class="vcard"
| class="fn org" | Fenton Barns
| class="adr" | East Lothian
| 
| class="note" | 
|- class="vcard"
| class="fn org" | Fenton Low
| class="adr" | City of Stoke-on-Trent
| 
| class="note" | 
|- class="vcard"
| class="fn org" | Fenton Pits
| class="adr" | Cornwall
| 
| class="note" | 
|- class="vcard"
| class="fn org" | Fenwick
| class="adr" | East Ayrshire
| 
| class="note" | 
|- class="vcard"
| class="fn org" | Fenwick (Matfen)
| class="adr" | Northumberland
| 
| class="note" | 
|- class="vcard"
| class="fn org" | Fenwick (Kyloe)
| class="adr" | Northumberland
| 
| class="note" | 
|- class="vcard"
| class="fn org" | Fenwick
| class="adr" | Doncaster
| 
| class="note" | 
|}

Feo-Few

|- class="vcard"
| class="fn org" | Feock
| class="adr" | Cornwall
| 
| class="note" | 
|- class="vcard"
| class="fn org" | Feorlig
| class="adr" | Highland
| 
| class="note" | 
|- class="vcard"
| class="fn org" | Ferguslie Park
| class="adr" | Renfrewshire
| 
| class="note" | 
|- class="vcard"
| class="fn org" | Ferinquarrie
| class="adr" | Highland
| 
| class="note" | 
|- class="vcard"
| class="fn org" | Fern
| class="adr" | Buckinghamshire
| 
| class="note" | 
|- class="vcard"
| class="fn org" | Fern
| class="adr" | Angus
| 
| class="note" | 
|- class="vcard"
| class="fn org" | Fern Bank
| class="adr" | Tameside
| 
| class="note" | 
|- class="vcard"
| class="fn org" | Ferndale
| class="adr" | Kent
| 
| class="note" | 
|- class="vcard"
| class="fn org" | Ferndale
| class="adr" | Rhondda Cynon Taff
| 
| class="note" | 
|- class="vcard"
| class="fn org" | Ferndown
| class="adr" | Dorset
| 
| class="note" | 
|- class="vcard"
| class="fn org" | Ferne
| class="adr" | Wiltshire
| 
| class="note" | 
|- class="vcard"
| class="fn org" | Ferness
| class="adr" | Highland
| 
| class="note" | 
|- class="vcard"
| class="fn org" | Ferney Green
| class="adr" | Cumbria
| 
| class="note" | 
|- class="vcard"
| class="fn org" | Fernham
| class="adr" | Oxfordshire
| 
| class="note" | 
|- class="vcard"
| class="fn org" | Fernhill
| class="adr" | Bury
| 
| class="note" | 
|- class="vcard"
| class="fn org" | Fernhill
| class="adr" | Rhondda, Cynon, Taff
| 
| class="note" | 
|- class="vcard"
| class="fn org" | Fern Hill
| class="adr" | Suffolk
| 
| class="note" | 
|- class="vcard"
| class="fn org" | Fernhill
| class="adr" | West Sussex
| 
| class="note" | 
|- class="vcard"
| class="fn org" | Fernhill Gate
| class="adr" | Bolton
| 
| class="note" | 
|- class="vcard"
| class="fn org" | Fernhill Heath
| class="adr" | Worcestershire
| 
| class="note" | 
|- class="vcard"
| class="fn org" | Fernhurst
| class="adr" | West Sussex
| 
| class="note" | 
|- class="vcard"
| class="fn org" | Fernie
| class="adr" | Fife
| 
| class="note" | 
|- class="vcard"
| class="fn org" | Ferniegair
| class="adr" | South Lanarkshire
| 
| class="note" | 
|- class="vcard"
| class="fn org" | Ferniehirst
| class="adr" | Scottish Borders
| 
| class="note" | 
|- class="vcard"
| class="fn org" | Fernilee
| class="adr" | Derbyshire
| 
| class="note" | 
|- class="vcard"
| class="fn org" | Fernsplatt
| class="adr" | Cornwall
| 
| class="note" | 
|- class="vcard"
| class="fn org" | Ferrensby
| class="adr" | North Yorkshire
| 
| class="note" | 
|- class="vcard"
| class="fn org" | Ferrindonald
| class="adr" | Highland
| 
| class="note" | 
|- class="vcard"
| class="fn org" | Ferring
| class="adr" | West Sussex
| 
| class="note" | 
|- class="vcard"
| class="fn org" | Ferrybridge
| class="adr" | Wakefield
| 
| class="note" | 
|- class="vcard"
| class="fn org" | Ferryden
| class="adr" | Angus
| 
| class="note" | 
|- class="vcard"
| class="fn org" | Ferry Hill
| class="adr" | Cambridgeshire
| 
| class="note" | 
|- class="vcard"
| class="fn org" | Ferryhill
| class="adr" | Durham
| 
| class="note" | 
|- class="vcard"
| class="fn org" | Ferryhill
| class="adr" | City of Aberdeen
| 
| class="note" | 
|- class="vcard"
| class="fn org" | Ferryhill Station
| class="adr" | Durham
| 
| class="note" | 
|- class="vcard"
| class="fn org" | Ferryside
| class="adr" | Carmarthenshire
| 
| class="note" | 
|- class="vcard"
| class="fn org" | Fersfield
| class="adr" | Norfolk
| 
| class="note" | 
|- class="vcard"
| class="fn org" | Fersit
| class="adr" | Highland
| 
| class="note" | 
|- class="vcard"
| class="fn org" | Feshiebridge
| class="adr" | Highland
| 
| class="note" | 
|- class="vcard"
| class="fn org" | Fetcham
| class="adr" | Surrey
| 
| class="note" | 
|- class="vcard"
| class="fn org" | Fetlar
| class="adr" | Shetland Islands
| 
| class="note" | 
|- class="vcard"
| class="fn org" | Fetterangus
| class="adr" | Aberdeenshire
| 
| class="note" | 
|- class="vcard"
| class="fn org" | Fettercairn
| class="adr" | Aberdeenshire
| 
| class="note" | 
|- class="vcard"
| class="fn org" | Fewcott
| class="adr" | Oxfordshire
| 
| class="note" | 
|- class="vcard"
| class="fn org" | Fewston
| class="adr" | North Yorkshire
| 
| class="note" | 
|- class="vcard"
| class="fn org" | Fewston Bents
| class="adr" | North Yorkshire
| 
| class="note" | 
|}